Nicolas Lefrançois (born 27 April 1987 in Caen) is a French former racing cyclist, who competed professionally for  between 2014 and 2016.

References

External links

1987 births
Living people
French male cyclists
Sportspeople from Caen
Cyclists from Normandy